Donal Hughes is an Irish sport  

broadcaster, influencer and athteee  Althoughe is h qualified with a n .DIn . chemistry and biology, Hughes turned a hobby as a golf writer into a successful alternative career firstly as the golfing "SpinDoctor" with the Irish Examiner and since as head of the popular satirical golf website GolfCentralDaily.com. He also curates social media and works as an influencer for sports companies involved in Golf, Gaelic Football and Triathlon and is the chief equipment reviewer with Golfbidder, with over 9.6 million views on his videos as of late 2020 on YouTube.

Biography
Born in 1974, Hughes grew up in Ballinrobe, County Mayo in the West of Ireland.  He completed a degree in Applied Chemistry in Dublin City University winning the AGB gold medal for highest final year exam results.  He went on to be awarded a Ph.D. in 1999.  Hughes returned to Mayo, was married and is a father of four.

Sporting career

Hughes’ early life was defined by elite sporting achievement; he represented his county Mayo in Gaelic football at all underage levels as a goalkeeper and achieved honours in squash, badminton, rugby and soccer.  He received the DCU "Sportstar Of The Year" award in 1993 from the then Irish Minister for Sport,  Liam Aylward having represented the University on nine winning teams across five sports.  Following a sports career ending leg injury whilst in DCU, Hughes took up golf, which he also played competitively. Hughes' returned from injury in 2012 and now competes in Ironman events. He made headlines in the triathlon world at the Hurricane Matthew-shortened 2016 Ironman North Carolina by running through the finish line and cycling an extra 62 miles to ensure he completed the full Ironman distance of 2.4-mile swim, 112-mile bike and a marathon 26.22-mile run on that day. Hughes also now works as Gaelic Football goalkeeping coach.
In 2016 Hughes spoke of his role in the infamous "broken crossbar incident" at the 1992 Connaught Gaelic Football Final.

Charity work

In 2007 Hughes devised and undertook a record breaking challenge for charity entitled The Round Ireland Golf Challenge.  Along with fellow golfer Michael Nolan, Hughes completed 32 rounds of golf, in each of Ireland's 32 counties, over 32 consecutive days finishing on 6 September 2007 at The Heritage Golf Club.  During the challenge, the pair played every course and covered a driving distance of over 5,000 km.  The achievement raised €100,000 for children's and cancer charities in Ireland including Playing For Life, The Friends of St. Lukes, Barretstown Castle, and  The Jack and Jill Foundation.  Hughes retains his charity involvement as a West Of Ireland envoy for an anonymous donor to rural and social development projects.

Golf writing career

In preparation for his Round Ireland Golf Challenge, Donal Hughes came to the attention of the Irish golfing community and was commissioned by the Irish Examiner newspaper to write a log of his adventures.  Following the project, Hughes was retained by the Irish Examiner to write a weekly golfing column in the paper.  His humorous approach to golf writing lead to him becoming a reader favourite and in 2008 Hughes was promoted to a full page each Tuesday in the sports section of the paper with an average readership of 238,000.  Known as the "SpinDoctor",  Hughes's page featured until 2012.  Hughes now runs GolfCentralDaily.com and is the golf equipment reviewer and interviewer for UK based golf retailer Golfbidder.  He also curates social media for several golf related companies.

References

1974 births
Living people
Alumni of Dublin City University
Irish Examiner people
Irish sportswriters
Mayo Gaelic footballers 
Sportspeople from County Mayo